The Copa Uruguay (officially Copa AUF Uruguay) is a knockout football competition in men's domestic Uruguayan football, starting in 2022.

The competition starts in June, with the winner of the cup qualifying for the following year's Copa Sudamericana, starting from the 2023 edition.

History
Historically, Uruguayan football never had a national cup tournament, aside from a competition called Torneo de Copa, which happened only in 1969. In 2018, teams started to mobilize in favour of the creation of a national cup, but nothing came of it.

On 20 April 2022, the Uruguayan Football Association announced the creation of the Copa AUF Uruguay, being approved by several clubs involved. The first edition of the competition, which was played from 22 June to 13 November 2022, was won by Defensor Sporting who defeated La Luz in the final.

Format
For its first edition in 2022, the competition was divided into two stages: a preliminary stage and the national stage.

In the preliminary stage, teams from the amateur lower leagues compete for 20 berths to the national stage. In the first phase of the national stage, 24 teams from the Primera División Amateur and Segunda División enter the competition, for a total of 48 teams which are divided into 24 ties, with the winners qualifying for the second round. The 24 second round winners advance to play against each other to define 12 winners into the third phase.

32 teams play in the third phase: 12 winners from the previous phase, 16 professional teams from the Primera División, the best relegated team of Primera División the previous season, the defending champion of the Primera División Amateur and the defending champion and runner-up of the Copa Nacional de Clubes. From this point onwards, the winners play against each other in two-legged knockout phases, with the Final being played in a single match.

The winner of the competition is also awarded a US$ 100,000 prize.

Results

Performance by club

References

National association football cups
Football in Uruguay